This is a list of notable self-help books.

Usually, books about positive thinking or optimism will reveal how an improved attitude will also lead to a more successful and healthy live. Health books tend to have at least a significant part on spirituality. Thus, the distinction in types above is slightly artificial and only based on the main tone of the book. In general, most of those books are or were bestsellers in their time and all aim at personal development with slightly different emphasis.

See also
 List of counseling topics
 Lists of books

References

Self-help books
Self-help books